The Governor's Museum is a museum atop St. Paul's Hill in Malacca City, Malacca, Malaysia, which exhibits the personal belongings of various governors of Malacca since the independence of Malaya. The museum's building was formerly used as the official residence and office of the Dutch Governor of Malacca. It was then used as the official residence of the Yang di-Pertua Negeri of Malacca until September 1996, before being turned into a museum, which was officially opened to the public in 2002.

See also
 List of museums in Malaysia
 List of tourist attractions in Malacca
 Similar British colonial residences:
 The Istana in Singapore.
 Suffolk House and The Residency in Penang.
 Carcosa in Kuala Lumpur.

References

2002 establishments in Malaysia
Buildings and structures in Malacca City
Museums established in 2002
Museums in Malacca